The discography of Japanese musician Miho Fukuhara consists of three studio albums, six extended plays,  five video albums and numerous singles. Fukuhara debuted as a singer in 2006 locally in Hokkaido, releasing The Roots and Step Up EP through Hokkaido Television Broadcasting's independent label Yumechika Records. After covering Celine Dion's "Because You Loved Me" in 2007, Fukuhara made her major label debut through Sony Music Japan in 2008.

Fukuhara's debut album Rainbow (2008) was a commercial success, becoming certified gold by the RIAJ and spawning the top 30 singles "Change", "Himawari", "Yasashii Aka" and "Love (Winter Song)". After releasing her second album Music Is My Life in 2010, Fukuhara released the concept extended plays Regrets of Love and The Soul Extreme EP. The leading track of The Soul Extreme EP, "O2" featuring singer Ai was a success, allowing Fukuhara to release a second extended play in the series, The Soul Extreme EP II, led by the song "Get Up!" featuring Akiko Wada.

In 2012, Fukuhara debuted as an actress in the musical comedy drama Kaeru no Ojōsama, and performed cover songs for the song's soundtrack. In 2013, Fukuhara was announced as the 6th vocalist for pop group Sweetbox, and was the group's featured vocalist for their album #Z21. In 2015, Fukuhara set up an independent music label, Happy Field Records, and in December of the same year released an extended play of new material, Something New.

Studio albums

Compilation albums

Live albums

Extended plays

Singles

As lead artist

As featured artist

Promotional singles

Other appearances

Video releases

Notes

References

Discographies of Japanese artists
Pop music discographies
Rhythm and blues discographies